William Morgan Sheppard (24 August 1932 – 6 January 2019) was an English actor who appeared in over 100 films and television programmes, in a career that spanned over 50 years.

Stage career
Sheppard graduated from the Royal Academy of Dramatic Art in 1958, before spending 12 years as an associate artist with the Royal Shakespeare Company. He appeared on Broadway in Marat/Sade (1966) and in Sherlock Holmes (1975). He won the Los Angeles Drama Critics Circle Award for The Homecoming in 1995.

Film career

Sheppard appeared in several episodes of different series of Star Trek, notably The Next Generations "The Schizoid Man" and Voyagers "Bliss". In the feature film Star Trek VI: The Undiscovered Country, his role was the warden of a Klingon gulag and in the 2009 reboot Star Trek, he played a member of the Vulcan High Council, but was uncredited. 
Outside of Star Trek, he is best known for his role as Blank Reg on Max Headroom and his role as the Confederate general Isaac R. Trimble in the films Gettysburg and Gods and Generals.

Sheppard appeared in two roles on the science-fiction series Babylon 5, in the episode titled "Soul Hunter", playing the eponymous character and also played Narn war leader G'Sten, an uncle of main character G'Kar, in "The Long Twilight Struggle". He was also a runner-up for the role of Ambassador G'Kar on the series, though the role eventually went to Andreas Katsulas.

Sheppard was one of several Star Trek actors who voiced characters on the animated series Gargoyles, wherein he played the father of Jonathan Frakes' character David Xanatos and the Norse god Odin.

Sheppard and his son, Mark Sheppard, acted together in a few productions. Sheppard appeared in the television series NCIS, in the season six episode "Broken Bird", where he played the older version of a man named Marcin Jerek, while his son played the younger version. He appeared in the opening episode of series six of Doctor Who, "The Impossible Astronaut", playing the character Canton Everett Delaware III. He portrayed an older version of Delaware, while his son portrayed the younger version in the same episode. He and his son are among the few actors who have appeared in both the Star Trek and Doctor Who franchises.

In December 2009, Sheppard voiced the part of Santa in Disney's Christmas special Prep & Landing. Following that, he returned as the voice of Santa in the sequels, Prep & Landing: Operation: Secret Santa and Prep & Landing: Naughty vs. Nice. On 4 December 2010, Sheppard appeared on Hallmark Channel Original Films Farewell Mr. Kringle as Kris Kringle.

Video game career
Sheppard voiced several characters in video games. He narrated the introductions and mission briefings for the first four installments of the Medal of Honor video-game series. He was cast in the 1996 adventure game Zork Nemesis, playing the live-action role of Bishop Francois Malveaux, one of the four alchemists central to the plot of the game. In 2000, he voiced the character Ignatius Cheese in the game Escape from Monkey Island. Sheppard voiced over for the character John Adams in the Wii game The Conduit. He provided the voice for the character Lucky in the 2002 Xbox (console) game Whacked!. On 4 August 2010, Sheppard was announced as the voice actor for the video game Civilization V. and provided the voice overs for loading screens, victory screens, built wonders, and newly researched technologies.

Personal life and death
Sheppard and wife Regina were the parents of actor Mark Sheppard. Sheppard died on 6 January 2019, in Los Angeles, California, aged 86.

Filmography

Film

Television

Video games

References

External links
 
 W. Morgan Sheppard (Aveleyman)

1932 births
2019 deaths
Alumni of RADA
English male film actors
English male stage actors
English male television actors
English male voice actors
English people of Irish descent
Male actors from London
Royal Shakespeare Company members
20th-century English male actors
21st-century English male actors